Chengwu County is a county of southwestern Shandong province, People's Republic of China. It is under the administration of Heze city.

The population in 1999 was 622,871.

Administrative divisions
As 2012, this County is divided to 10 towns and 2 townships.
Towns

Townships
 Dangji Township
 Zhanglou Township

Climate

References

External links
 Official site

Counties of Shandong
Heze